Milan Kolibiar (born 14 February 1922 in Detvianska Huta, died 9 July 1994 in Bratislava) was a Slovak mathematician.

He worked mostly in lattice theory and universal algebra.

External links
Milan Kolibiar's entry at biographies of Slovak mathematicians on the website of Mathematical Institute of Slovak academy of science

References
 T. Katriňák: Professor Milan Kolibiar šesťdesiatročný, Math. Slovaca 32 (2), 1982, 189–194 

1922 births
1994 deaths
Slovak mathematicians
Comenius University alumni
Czechoslovak mathematicians